Milk Farm Restaurant was a restaurant in Dixon, California off I-80, that played a big part in Dixon's dairy economy during World War II. It was considered to be the city's landmark.

History
Karl A. Hess had the idea to build the Milk Farm restaurant in 1919. He built his first restaurant in 1924 on Sievers Road. It moved to the current Milk Farm road location along highway 113 in 1939. Originally called Hess Station, it gained the moniker Milk Farm in 1940 when The Saturday Evening Post wrote an article about it, and also gave Dixon the nickname “Dairy Town” for its contribution to the California dairy industry. 

During World War II, Mr. Hess offered various deals, such as an all-you-can-drink milk contest for only 10 cents, pony rides for children, and reasonably priced chicken dinners. The Milk Farm became a hangout for teenagers, and people competed to break the record of the most milk consumed in order to get their names on the restaurant's record board. 

In 1946 Glynn and Homer Henderson became the new owners of the restaurant. The restaurant stayed open for many decades until closing in 1986 after a large hole was blown in the roof during a violent windstorm. The restaurant building was removed in 2000. 

A Milk Farm sign, measuring 100 feet tall, was built in May 1963 and still stands today. Even after closing, the Milk Farm's animated neon road sign stayed illuminated for years afterward due to its local popularity.

Future plans

Though the building is no longer at its original location, it has been placed in storage with the possibility of future restoration and placement in a local history museum.  there are tentative plans to turn the property into a business plaza.  The project is currently for sale after trading hands at a foreclosure sale.  The current owners are pursuing development joint ventures and entertaining offers for sale.

As of 2022, Milk Farm Development LLC purchased the entire 60 acre property. The principals of the firm plan on restoring the historical Milk Farm Restaurant and other highway commercial services.

References

Restaurants in the San Francisco Bay Area
History of Solano County, California
Companies based in Solano County, California
Restaurants established in 1928
American companies established in 1928
1928 establishments in California
1986 disestablishments in California
Defunct restaurants in the San Francisco Bay Area